The Telegraph Act 1868  (31 & 32 Vict. c.110) was an Act of the Parliament of the United Kingdom. It paved the way for the British state to take over telegraph companies and/or their operations.

It has been effectively repealed (only s.1, providing the short title remains in force).

It was one of Post Office Acts 1837 to 1895.

See also
General Post Office
Telegraph Act
UK public service law
Attorney General v Edison Telephone Co of London Ltd (1880–81) LR 6 QBD 244

References
Terramedia UK media law - accessed 6 March 2009

United Kingdom Acts of Parliament 1868
1868 in British law
Telecommunications in the United Kingdom